The One Hundred Thirty-Third Ohio General Assembly was a meeting of the Ohio state legislature, composed of the Ohio State Senate and the Ohio House of Representatives.  It convened in Columbus, Ohio on January 7, 2019 and adjourned December 31, 2020.  The apportionment of legislative districts was based on the 2010 United States census and 2011 redistricting plan.  Both the Ohio Senate and Ohio House of Representatives were retained by the Ohio Republican Party.

Party summary
Resignations and new members are discussed in the "Changes in membership" section, below.

Senate

House of Representatives

Leadership

Senate
Senate President: Larry Obhof
President Pro Tempore: Bob Peterson

Majority (Republican) leadership 
Majority Floor Leader: Matt Huffman
Majority Whip: Jay Hottinger

Minority (Democratic) leadership
Senate Minority Leader: Kenny Yuko
Assistant Minority Leader: Cecil Thomas
Minority Whip: Sean O'Brien
Assistant Minority Whip: Sandra Williams

House of Representatives
Speaker of the House: Larry Householder, until July 30, 2020
Robert R. Cupp, from July 30, 2020
Speaker Pro Tempore: Jim Butler

Majority (Republican) leadership 
Majority Floor Leader: Bill Seitz
Assistant Majority Floor Leader: Anthony DeVitis
Majority Whip: Jay Edwards
Assistant Majority Whip: Laura Lanese

Minority (Democratic) leadership
 House Minority Leader: Emilia Sykes
Assistant Minority Leader: Kristin Boggs
Minority Whip: Kent Smith
Assistant Minority Whip: Paula Hicks-Hudson

Membership

Senate

House of Representatives

Changes in membership

Senate

House of Representatives

Committees 
Listed alphabetically by chamber, including Chairperson and Ranking Member.

Senate

House of Representatives

See also
 List of Ohio state legislatures

References 

Ohio legislative sessions
Ohio
Ohio
2019 in Ohio
2020 in Ohio